Jan Koukal (born 29 July 1951 in Brno) is a Czech politician.

Biography
After studying theoretical physics at the Charles University in Prague (1969–74) Koukal worked at the Czechoslovak Academy of Sciences, specialising on surface physics.

Jan Koukal has been a member of the Civic Democratic Party (ODS). From 1993 to 1998 he was mayor of Prague and from 1996 to 1998 member of Senate of the Czech Republic. In 2006, after a few months of training at the Ministry of Foreign Affairs, he was named as an ambassador of the Czech Republic in Austria.

External links
Official biography 
Arrest by the police for drunk driving

1951 births
Living people
Mayors of Prague
Politicians from Brno
Civic Democratic Party (Czech Republic) Senators
Ambassadors of the Czech Republic to Austria
Civic Democratic Party (Czech Republic) mayors
Charles University alumni